"Baila Conmigo" is a song by American singer Selena Gomez and Puerto Rican singer Rauw Alejandro for Gomez's fourth extended play Revelación (2021). It was written by Jorge A. Diaz, Edgar Barrera, Alejandro Borrero, Gomez, Abner Cordero Boria, Tainy, Ivanni Rodríguez, Alberto Carlos Melendez, Elena Rose, Alejandro, and Christopher Carballo Ramos, while the production was handled by NEON16, Jota Rosa, Albert Hype, and Tainy. The song was released for digital download and streaming by Interscope Records on January 29, 2021, as the second single from the EP. A Spanish language slow-wind reggaeton song with bouncy midtempo drum rhythms, it is about dance and desire, despite there being a language barrier between the singers. The track received widely positive reviews from music critics, who complimented its danceable and catchy rhythm and the singers' vocals.

"Baila Conmigo" won the award for Music-Ship of the Year at the 2021 MTV Millennial Awards and was nominated for Collaboration of the Year – Pop at the 2022 Lo Nuestro Awards. The song was commercially successful, reaching number one in seven countries, including Argentina and Venezuela, as well as the top five in several other countries such as Bolivia and Costa Rica, and on Billboards Hot Latin Songs in the United States. It also reached the summit of the Latin Airplay, Latin Pop Airplay, and Latin Rhythm Airplay charts, and became Alejandro's first entry on the Billboard Hot 100. The song has received several certifications, including double platinum in Spain. An accompanying music video, released simultaneously with the song, was directed by Fernando Nogari.

Background and release
In a February 2020 interview with Dazed, Selena Gomez revealed that she had plans to release Spanish-language music. In December 2020, she stated that she has "a whole little vessel of good things coming", and Billboard stated that this "could include a Spanish-language project". Various murals were spotted in Mexico, stating the song titles "De Una Vez" and "Baila Conmigo", generating speculation amidst fans and mainstream media that Gomez would be releasing Latin music soon.

On January 14, 2021, Gomez released "De Una Vez" as the lead single from her first Spanish-language EP, Revelación (2021). The words "baila conmigo" were seen at the end of the music video. On January 26, Gomez shared the artwork for "Baila Conmigo" and announced that it was a collaboration with Rauw Alejandro and would be released on January 29. Gomez said in a press release that, with the song, she "wants to get everyone dancing." During an interview with E! Online, Alejandro stated:

During an interview with Billboard, Gomez told the magazine: "I knew I wanted a male voice on 'Baila Conmigo' and I love Rauw's voice; I think he brings the right amount of sexiness to the song." On January 29, 2021, "Baila Conmigo" was released for digital download and streaming by Interscope Records as the second single from the EP, marking the first collaboration between Gomez and Alejandro. It was included as the third track on Revelación, released March 12, 2021.

Music and lyrics

Musically, "Baila Conmigo" is a slow-wind reggaeton song, with bouncy midtempo drum rhythms. It starts with a funky fingerpicked bass guitar riff, which has been compared with Charlie Puth records. The song was written by Jorge A. Diaz, Edgar Barrera, Alejandro Borrero, Gomez, Abner Cordero Boria, Tainy, Ivanni Rodríguez, Alberto Carlos Melendez, Elena Rose, Alejandro, and Christopher Carballo Ramos. Its production was handled by NEON16, Jota Rosa, Albert Hype, and Tainy, and the track runs for a total of 3 minutes and 6 seconds. According to the song's sheet music on Musicnotes.com, the song is composed in the key of D minor with a groove of 120 beats per minute. The singers' vocals span from the low note of D3 to the high note of A4.

In "Baila Conmigo", which translates to "Dance with Me" in English, Gomez and Alejandro exchange sultry lyrics about dance and desire, despite there being a language barrier between them. The lyrics include, "Bebé, no sé si hablas mucho español / Si entiendes cuando digo 'mi amor' / Comernos sin entendernos, es mejor / Solo tenemos que gustarnos" ("Baby, I don't know if you speak a lot of Spanish / If you understand when I say 'my love' / Devouring each other without understanding each other is better / We only have to like each other").

Critical reception
Upon release, "Baila Conmigo" was met with widely positive reviews from music critics. Billboards Griselda Flores described the song as "seductive and contagious". Carolyn Twersky of Seventeen wrote that the track will "definitely have you up and dancing", while Josh Mendes from Monitor Latino desrcribed it as "catchy" due to its "musical structure". Gabriella Ferlita from Gigwise called Gomez's vocals "soft" and wavering" and Alejandro's tone "silky". Writing for We Are Mitú, Lucas Villa described the chemistry between Alejandro and Gomez in the track as "tangible", and called them a "dream team that we didn’t know we needed." In his review for Rolling Stone, he stated that "Gomez playfully channels the criticism that she's not fluent in Spanish into a red-hot moment on the EP" in "Baila Conmigo". Also from Rolling Stone, Ernesto Lechner ranked the track as the Alejandro's 50th-best song and named it "a cure for post-pandemic isolation".

Accolades
Amazon Music ranked "Baila Conmigo" as the eighth-best Latin song of 2021. The song has received a number of awards and nominations. It won the award for Music-Ship of the Year at the 2021 MTV Millennial Awards and was nominated for Collaboration of the Year – Pop at the 2022 Lo Nuestro Awards.

Commercial performance
"Baila Conmigo" debuted and peaked at number four on the US Billboard Hot Latin Songs chart on February 13, 2021, with a first-week tally of 3000 downloads sold, 6.1 million streams, and 4.7 million radio impressions. Thus, it became both Gomez and Alejandro's third top 10 hit on the chart. The song also reached number one on the US Latin Digital Song Sales, Latin Airplay, Latin Rhythm Airplay, and Latin Pop Airplay charts. On the US Billboard Hot 100, "Baila Conmigo" debuted and peaked at number 74, giving Alejandro his first entry. It also became the highest-charting track from Revelación, surpassing "De Una Vez" which peaked at 92. In Canada, "Baila Conmigo" debuted and peaked at number 68 on Billboards Canadian Hot 100 on the chart issue dated February 13, 2021, earning Alejandro his first entry.

Besides North America, the track hit the charts in several European countries, including France, Germany, and Switzerland. In the Netherlands, the song peaked at number one on the Single Tip chart on February 6, 2021. In Spain's official weekly chart, the song debuted at number 10 on February 7, 2021, becoming Gomez's fourth and Alejandro's seventh top-10 hit on the chart. It subsequently peaked at number seven on the chart on February 21, 2021. It was later certified double platinum by the Productores de Música de España (PROMUSICAE), for track-equivalent sales of over 80,000 units in the country. In Latin America, the song experienced further commercial success. It peaked at number one in Argentina, Ecuador, Panama, Paraguay, Puerto Rico, and Venezuela, and reached the top 10 in Bolivia, Costa Rica, El Salvador, Latin America, Mexico, Peru, and Uruguay. In Guatemala, Honduras, and Nicaragua, it reached the top 20.

Promotion

Music video
A music video for "Baila Conmigo" premiered alongside the track's release on January 29, 2021, and was directed by Brazilian filmmaker Fernando Nogari. In the video, a woman sits alone watching Alejandro and Gomez dance and perform to the song. This inspires the woman out to the beach where she dances to the song. Gomez only appears in the video a "handful of times". The video was filmed between Los Angeles, Miami and a remote fishing village in Brazil. On the video and its significance with the COVID-19 pandemic, Gomez said: "The video portrays the sense of isolation we all are experiencing right now and how music truly does connect us all no matter where we are in the world."

Live performances
Gomez and Alejandro performed "Baila Conmigo" as pre-taped for the 33rd Annual Lo Nuestro Awards on February 18, 2021.

Track listing

Credits and personnel
Credits adapted from Tidal.

 Selena Gomez associated performer, composer, lyricist, background vocalist, vocals
 Rauw Alejandro associated performer, composer, lyricist
 Tainy associated performer, producer, composer, lyricist, programming
 Abner Cordero Boria composer, lyricist
 Christopher Carballo Ramos composer, lyricist
 Alberto Carlos Melendez composer, lyricist
 Elena Rose associated performer, composer, lyricist, background vocalist
 Edgar Barrera composer, lyricist
 Alejandro Borrero composer, lyricist
 Ivanni Rodríguez composer, lyricist, A&R
 Jorge A. Diaz composer, lyricist
 Albert Hype associated performer, producer, programming
 Jota Rosa associated performer, producer, programming
 Neon16 producer
 John Janick A&R
 Sam Riback A&R
 Vanessa Angiuli A&R
 Lex Borrero A&R
 Bart Schoudel associated performer, engineer, vocal producer
 John Hanes engineer
 Angelo Carretta engineer
 Chris Gehringer mastering engineer
 Serban Ghenea mixer

Charts

Weekly charts

Monthly charts

Year-end charts

Certifications

Release history

See also
 List of Billboard Argentina Hot 100 top-ten singles in 2021
List of Billboard Hot Latin Songs and Latin Airplay number ones of 2021

References

 

2021 singles
2021 songs
Rauw Alejandro songs
Selena Gomez songs
Impact of the COVID-19 pandemic on the music industry
Interscope Records singles
Spanish-language songs
Songs written by Selena Gomez
Songs written by Elena Rose
Songs written by Edgar Barrera
Songs written by Tainy
Songs written by Rauw Alejandro